Robert J. "Bob" Mazzuca (born 1947) was the 11th Chief Scout Executive of the Boy Scouts of America. His term started in 2007, and he retired on August 31, 2012.

Early life and family
Robert Mazzuca was born in 1947 in San Juan Bautista, California. As a boy, Mazzuca joined Boy Scout Troop 28 (now 428) and earned the rank of Eagle Scout in 1964. While a Scout he attended Pico Blanco Scout Reservation of the Monterey Bay Area Council for four summers, including two as staff. Mazzuca was inducted into the Order of the Arrow as a member of Esselen Lodge.

In 1970, Mazzuca received a Bachelor of Arts degree in history from California Polytechnic State University in San Luis Obispo, California.

Mazzuca and his wife Nanette have two sons, one of whom, Vince Mazzuca served as a professional Scouter in the Baltimore Area Council from 2003 to 2005 and then returned in 2006 until 2007.

Scouting career
Mazzuca began his Scouting professional career in 1971 in Modesto, California as a district executive and as an Exploring executive. He became the Exploring director in Sacramento in 1975 and rose to the positions of field director and the director of field service.

In 1983, Mazzuca became the Scout executive in Stockton, California. He later served as an area director in the Western Region before returning to Sacramento as the Scout executive. In 1992 he became the assistant regional director for the Southern Region and in 1995 he became the Scout executive of the Greater Pittsburgh Council.

In 2005, he became the national director of the development group at the National Council and in 2006 became the assistant Chief Scout Executive.  Mazzuca succeeded Roy Williams as Chief Scout Executive on September 1, 2007.

Mazzuca is a lifetime member of the National Catholic Committee on Scouting. In July 2008 Mazzuca became an honorary chieftain in the Tribe of Mic-O-Say at H. Roe Bartle Scout Reservation. In 2009 Mazzuca was presented the Distinguished Eagle Scout Award.

Robert Mazzuca, Chief Scout Executive of Boy Scouts of America, received $1,211,572 salary/compensation from the charity. This is the 4th most money given by any charity to the head of the charity, according to Charity Watch.

Upon his retirement at the end of August 2012, Mazzuca was succeeded by Wayne Brock, previously the BSA's Deputy Chief Scout Executive/Chief Operating Officer.

Honors and awards
Mazzuca is the fifth Chief Scout Executive to serve as a Chieftain in the Tribe of Mic-O-Say.
He is also a 2009 recipient of the Order of the Arrow's Distinguished Service Award.

See also

References

External links
 

1947 births
Living people
American people of Italian descent
Chief Scout Executives
California Polytechnic State University alumni
Businesspeople from California
People from San Juan Bautista, California
National Executive Board of the Boy Scouts of America members